Uran Bislimi (born 25 September 1999) is a professional footballer who plays as a midfielder for Swiss club Lugano. Born in Switzerland, he has previously represented Kosovo national team.

Club career

Lugano
On 19 July 2022, Bislimi signed a four-year contract with Swiss Super League club Lugano. Five days later, he made his debut in a 2–1 away defeat against Grasshoppers after coming on as a substitute at 72nd minute in place of Mattia Bottani.

International career

Youth
In March 2018, Bislimi becomes part of Switzerland U19 with which he made his debut in a 2–2 home draw against Finland U19 after being named in the starting line-up. On 2 September 2019, he received a call-up from Kosovo U21 for the 2021 UEFA European Under-21 Championship qualification match against England U21, but he was an unused substitute in that match.

Senior
Bislimi was planned to be called up from Kosovo in September 2022 for 2022–23 UEFA Nations League matches against Northern Ireland and Cyprus, but he declined to be part of the national team as he wanted to focus on playing at club level. On 11 November 2022, he accepted a call-up from Kosovo for the friendly matches against Armenia and Faroe Islands. His debut with Kosovo came five days later in a friendly match against Armenia after being named in the starting line-up. Three days after debut, Bislimi scored his first goal for Kosovo in his second appearance for the country in a 1–1 home draw over Faroe Islands.

On 20 March 2023, Kosovo manager Bajram Shala during the media conference before the UEFA Euro 2024 qualifying matches against Israel and Andorra said that Bislimi still has dilemmas about which national team he will play for and so we have decided that this player will no longer have a place in the national team.

International goals

References

External links

1999 births
Living people
Footballers from Basel
Kosovan footballers
Kosovo international footballers
Swiss men's footballers
Switzerland youth international footballers
Swiss people of Kosovan descent
Swiss people of Albanian descent
Association football midfielders
Swiss Challenge League players
FC Schaffhausen players
Swiss Super League players
FC Lugano players